The 2018–19 Israel State Cup (Gvia HaMedina) is the 80th season of Israel's nationwide Association football cup competition and the 65th after the Israeli Declaration of Independence.

The competition commenced in September 2018.

Preliminary rounds

First to fourth rounds

Rounds 1 to 4 double as cup competition for each division in Liga Bet and Liga Gimel. The two third-Round winners from each Liga Bet division and the fourth-Round winner from each Liga Gimel division advance to the sixth Round.

Liga Bet

Liga Bet North A

Maccabi Sektzia Ma'alot-Tarshiha won the district cup and qualified along with Beitar Nahariya to the sixth round.

Liga Bet North B

F.C. Daburiyya won the district cup and qualified along with Maccabi Bnei Raina to the sixth round.

Liga Bet South A

Hapoel Hod HaSharon won the district cup and qualified along with Shimshon Tel Aviv to the sixth round.

Liga Bet South B

F.C. Dimona won the district cup and qualified along with Ironi Modi'in to the sixth round.

Liga Gimel

Liga Gimel Upper Galilee

F.C. Aramshe Danun won the district cup and qualified to the sixth round.

Liga Gimel Lower Galilee

Maccabi Basmat Tab'un won the district cup and qualified to the sixth round.

Liga Gimel Jezreel

F.C. Pardes Hanna Lior Bokar won the district cup and qualified to the sixth round.

Liga Gimel Shomron

Maccabi Neve Sha'anan Eldad won the district cup and qualified to the sixth round.

Liga Gimel Sharon

Club Sporting Tel Aviv won the district cup and qualified to the sixth round.

Liga Gimel Tel Aviv

Maccabi HaShikma Ramat Hen won the district cup and qualified to the sixth round.

Liga Gimel Center

Hapoel Gedera won the district cup and qualified to the sixth round.

Liga Gimel South

Hapoel Sderot won the district cup and qualified to the sixth round.

Fifth Round
The fifth Round is played within each division of Liga Alef. The winners qualify to the sixth Round

Sixth Round

Seventh Round

Hapoel Bnei Lod, Beitar Tel Aviv Ramla, Hapoel Marmorek and Hapoel Akko were pre-qualified for the Next Round.

Eighth Round

Round of 16

Quarter-finals

First leg

Second Leg

Semi-finals

Final

See also
2018-2019 Israeli Women's Cup

Notes

References

External links
 Israel Football Association website 
soccerway

State Cup
Israel State Cup seasons
Israel